The New York City Police Department School Safety Division is the law enforcement agency for New York City Department of Education schools. The agency is a division of the New York City Police Department Community Affairs Bureau, and is one of the largest school-based law enforcement agencies in New York City, and the United States, with approximately 5,000 school safety agents and 200 police officers.

History
The New York City Police Department School Safety Division was formed in 1998 when the School Safety force was transferred from the New York City Department of Education to the New York City Police Department. Since then, the School Safety force has expanded in duties and in number of officers. In 2006, NYPD school safety agents were classified Civil Service Status with the first DCAS Civil Service exam given on June 9, 2007.

Power and authority
School safety agents are designated as New York City special patrolmen. School safety agents can make warrant-less arrests, carry and use handcuffs, and use physical force or deadly force, if necessary, to keep students, teachers, staff and fellow agents safe.

School Safety Agents are classified as peace officers under the New York Criminal Procedure Law.

Uniform and vehicles
School safety agents wear French blue uniform shirts with dark blue pants, almost identical to the NYPD's traffic enforcement agents (TEAs) with the exception of their eight-point uniform caps. SSAs use the dark blue caps just as uniformed police officers do. Their badge is oval with an eagle on top, in contrast to the shield worn by police officers. Vehicles are either dark blue with white decals or white with light blue decals.

Fallen officers
Since the establishment of the New York City Police Department School Safety Division, two officers have died while on duty, one in 1999 and one in 2005. Both deaths were caused by heart attack.

Official duties 
School safety agents are often seen on the perimeters of the city's schools and inside the halls of all middle and high schools. SSA's may have only one agent in the school or many depending on the size of the school and the student population.  Additionally, some Agents are assigned to squad cars, or RMP's in NYPD parlance, to respond to incidents and emergencies.  Due to the peace officer status of the Agents, some assist in taking emergency calls adjacent to school grounds.

SSD separates agents by "levels" with a civilian assistant commissioner of the New York City Police Department overseeing the administrative functions of the division.

Agents may promote via examinations administered by the New York City Department of Citywide Administrative Services, the city agency charged with civil service examinations.

This division is not to be confused with the NYPD school crossing guards, which are civilian employees with no police or peace officer powers. However, the two divisions often work hand in hand to provide both safe travel to and from school, as well as safety inside the facilities and classroom operated by the city's public school system.

See also

List of law enforcement agencies in New York
Law enforcement in New York City
New York City Police Commissioner
Security police

References

External links 
 Official Site
 Teamsters Local 237
 

School police departments of New York (state)
School Safety Division
1998 establishments in New York City